Nissim Otmazgin is an Israeli scholar, specializing in the field of Asian studies. Since 2021, he has served as the Dean of the Faculty of Humanities at the Hebrew University of Jerusalem. Otmazgin has previously served as the Chair of the Institute for Asian and African Studies, as the Director of the Harry S. Truman Research Institute for the Advancement of Peace, and as the Chair of the Department of Asian Studies.

Early life and career 

Otmazgin was born and raised in Dimona, to a family of seven. His father worked in the Dead Sea factory, and his mother was a kindergarten assistant teacher. After graduating high school and completing his military service in the IDF Otmazgin travelled to Japan, which held a fascination for him from a young age. In 1995–1997 he spent 2 years studying Japanese language and Culture studies at the Tōyō Gengo Gakuin school in Tokyo. Following that, Otmazgin returned to Israel and entered the Hebrew University, completing his B.A. in Political Science and Asian Studies in 2001.

For his graduate studies, Otmazgin attended Kyoto University, founded by a scholarship from Japan's Ministry of Education, Culture, Sports, Science and Technology (Monkashō). During his six years in Kyoto University, Otmazgin studied and wrote his Ph.D. dissertation under the guidance of Shiraishi Takashi, who specializes in political and social change in the Asian region. His dissertation, which examined the export of Japan's popular culture to Asia, won the Iue Asia Pacific research prize (October 2007) for outstanding dissertation on society and culture in Asia. After completing his PhD, Otmazgin returned to Israel and became a postdoctoral fellow at the Louis Frieberg Center For East Asian Studies in the Hebrew University of Jerusalem.

Otmazgin has been has been a visiting fellow at numerous academic institutions, including Kyoto University's Center for Southeast Asian Studies in 2007, Cornell University's East Asia Program in 2009 and 2011, Sciences-Po's Center for International Studies and Research in 2010, the National University of Singapore's department of Japanese Studies in 2011, the University of Sydney department of Japanese Studies in 2012, Dōshisha University's Faculty of Policy Studies in 2013, National Graduate Institute for Policy Studies in 2014, Osaka University's Graduate School of Languages and Culture in 2015, Korea University's faculty of Liberal Arts in 2015, Kyoto University's institute for the Studies of Humanities in 2016, and Academia Sinica's department of Sociology in 2017.

Research 
Otmazgin's research interests include Japanese and Korean media industries, cultural regionalization in East Asia, and Japan-Southeast Asian Relations, and cultural diplomacy in East Asia. His background in Political Science and East Asian Studies, throughout his studies he has been interested by the possibility of combining social science methodologies and area specialization with the goal of analyzing and explaining social and cultural phenomena.

Awards and prizes 
Otmazgin has received several research grants, including from the European Union's Marie Curie Program, the Israel Science Foundation, the Academy of Korean Studies, the Japan Foundation, the Korea Foundation, and the Taiwan Fellowship. In 2012, he was awarded the Hebrew University's Ben-Porath Presidential Award for Outstanding Young Researcher. He is a founding member and served as chair of the Israeli Association for Japanese Studies (IAJS), was a member of the Israeli Young Academy of Sciences and Humanities (2015–2019), and a member of the committee for the council of higher education for the advancement of Humanities (2018–2019).

In addition to these grants, he has won the Taiwan Fellowship Award to conduct field research in Taiwan in 2017, The Korea Foundation Award to conduct research in Korea in 2015, The Japan Foundation Award to conduct research in Japan in 2014.
 Professor Yoram Ben-Porat's Presidential Award for Outstanding Young Researcher for the year 2012–2013.
 Selected as a member of Israel Academy of Sciences and Humanities' Young Scientists Forum in the Humanities and Social Sciences (2011)
 Sir Zelman Cowen University Fund for academic exchange fellowship at The University of Sydney (2010).

Bibliography

Books 

 Daliot-Bul, Michal; Otmazgin, Nissim (2017). The anime boom in the United States : lessons for global creative industries. Cambridge, Massachusetts: Harvard University Asia Center Press. . OCLC 982089124
 Otmazgin, Nissim (2014). Regionalizing culture : the political economy of Japanese popular culture in Asia. Honolulu: University of Hawaii Press. . OCLC 862135620

Edited Volumes 

 Otmazgin, Nissim, and Eyal Ben-Ari, eds. Creativity and Innovation in the Media and Cultural Industries. London: Springer, 2020.
 Park, Gil-sung, Nissim Otmazgin and Keith Howard, eds. Transcultural Fandom and the Globalization of Hallyu. Seoul: Korea University Press, 2019.
 Otmazgin, Nissim and Rebecca Suter, eds. Stories for the Nation: Rewriting History in Manga. Palgrave-Macmillan, 2016.
 Ben-Rafael Galanti, Sigal, Nissim Otmazgin and Alon Levkowitz, eds. Japan's Multilayered Democracy. Lanham, MD: Lexington Books, 2014.
 Otmazgin, Nissim, and Eyal Ben-Ari, eds. Popular Culture Co-productions and Collaborations in East and Southeast Asia. Singapore: National University of Singapore Press and Kyoto University Press, 2013.
 Otmazgin, Nissim and Eyal Ben-Ari, eds. Popular Culture and the State in East and Southeast Asia. London: Routledge, 2012.

Selected publications

References

External links
 

Hebrew University of Jerusalem alumni
Kyoto University alumni
Academic staff of the Hebrew University of Jerusalem
Year of birth missing (living people)
Living people